Hauts Plateaux may refer to:

 Hauts-Plateaux, a department of Cameroon. 
 The Central Highlands (Madagascar), a mountainous region of central Madagascar.  
 The Hautes Plaines, a natural region of Algeria.
 The Central Highlands (Vietnam), one of the regions of Vietnam. 

fr:Hauts-Plateaux